Great St. Johnswort or great St. John's wort is a common name for several plants and may refer to:

Hypericum ascyron
Hypericum calycinum